Cerebral vasospasm is the prolonged, intense vasoconstriction of the larger conducting arteries in the subarachnoid space which is initially surrounded by a clot. 

Significant narrowing of the blood vessels in the brain develops gradually over the first few days after the aneurysmal rupture. This kind of narrowing usually is maximal in about a week's time following intracerebral haemorrhage.

Vasospasm is one of the leading causes of death after the aneurysmal rupture along with the effect of the initial haemorrhage and later bleeding.

References

Brain disorders